Cheugugi (Hangul: 측우기, Hanja: 測雨器) is the first well-known rain gauge invented and used during the Joseon dynasty of Korea. It was invented and supplied to each provincial offices during the King Sejong the Great's reign. As of 2010, only one example of the Cheugugi remains, known as the Geumyeong Cheugugi (Hangul: 금영측우기, Hanja: 錦營測雨器), which literally means "Cheugugi installed on the provincial office's yard." It is designated as National Treasures #561 of Korea and was installed in provincial office of Gongju city, 1837 by King Yeongjo, the 21st king of Joseon. In addition, the official record of the rainfall by Cheugugi from King Jeongjo's reign to Emperor Gojong's reign is preserved.

Intention 
In the early days of the Joseon dynasty, there was a system to measure and report a region's rainfall for the sake of agriculture. However, the method to measure rainfall in those days was primitive, measuring the depth of rain water in puddles.

This method could not tell the exact rainfall, because there are differences in the amount of rainwater absorbed into the ground by the nature of the local soil. To prevent errors of this kind, King Sejong the Great ordered the Gwansanggam (Hangul: 관상감, Hanja: 觀象監) (the Joseon kingdom's research institute of astronomy, geography, calendar and weather) to build a rainwater container, the Cheugugi, made of iron in August 1441 (according to the lunar calendar) based on the idea of his Crown Prince, later became Munjong of Joseon. In the early days of the Cheugugi, it was mainly used in the capital area only.

In 1442, the king ordered the Gwansanggam again to design a standardized system to measure and record the rainfall. He also ordered his provincial governors, appointed by the king, to install the same Cheugugi in the courtyard of each provincial office, where the governors would measure and record the rainfall.

It was originally made of iron, but there were copper and ceramic ones built later.

Exterior features 
As it is described above, the Cheugugi was mainly made of iron. By observing the preserved one, it is generally characterized by its oil-drum shape which is fixed on the hexahedral stone support, Cheugudae (측우대). The reasonable height of the Cheugudae means the splashed water can not flow into the Cheugugi. 

The depth of the preserved Cheugugi is about 32 cm and the diameter is about 15 cm.

Operation 
It is estimated that the measuring rainfalls by the standardized Cheugugi was institutionalized from May 8, 1442 (lunar calendar). From that day, the word "Cheugugi" was inscribed on the official records of the Annals of the Joseon Dynasty (조선왕조실록).

The rainfall is measured by dipping a ruler and recorded by poon (Hangul: 푼, Hanja: 分) units (approximately 0.303 cm (0.120 inch)). Furthermore, the information of the time when the rain began and stopped is recorded by each case, always, throughout the nation.

Examples 
Some Cheugudaes continue to exist:
 The Gwansanggam Cheugudae
 Daegu Sunhwadang Cheugudae (established at Daegu)
 Changdeokgung Palace's Cheugudae (moved to the National Palace Museum of Korea)
 Tongyeong Cheugudae
 Yeon-gyeong-dang (the royal residence in forbidden garden of Changdeokgung Palace) Cheugudae

There is also Ma-jeon-gyo (Bridge) which is generally known as Supyo-gyo across the Cheonggyecheon (stream flows center of Joseon era's Seoul city (inside area of the Seoul wall), near the Gyungbok Palace). The generally known name originated from the Supyo-seok attached on the pier of the bridge. The Supyo-seok's meaning and function is "the water level gauge" of Cheonggyecheon, telling how much the stream's water level rises by rain. It was established in King Sejong the Great's reign (second year of his reign) and is existing nowadays. But 1958 when the Cheonggyecheon was covered as a road by the Korean government, it was moved to Jang-chung park and it is there. There was a plan to move the bridge to its original location, during the Cheonggyecheon restoration. But, unfortunately the plan can't be fulfilled, because there was a difference between the restored width of the Cheonggyecheon and the bridge's length. So, the bridge remains in Jang-chung Park.

References 

Korean inventions
Measuring instruments
Meteorological instrumentation and equipment
Rain